Svetlana Razvorotneva (born March 25, 1968, Moscow) is a Russian political figure and a deputy of the 8th State Duma. In 1992, she was granted a Candidate of Sciences in Political Sciences degree. 

From 1992 to 1995, Razvorotneva worked as a laboratory assistant and junior scientist at the Institute for US and Canadian Studies. From 1995 to 2003, she was an independent consultant in the field of public relations and election technologies. In 2003-2004, she headed press services of the People's Party of the Russian Federation. From 2010 to 2014, Razvorotneva was a member of the Civic Chamber of the Russian Federation of the 3rd and 4th convocations. From 2012 to 2021, she was an Executive Director of the National Center for Public Control in the Sphere of Housing and Communal Services "ZhKH Control". Since September 2021, she has served as deputy of the 8th State Duma.

References

1968 births
Living people
United Russia politicians
21st-century Russian politicians
Eighth convocation members of the State Duma (Russian Federation)
Politicians from Moscow
Moscow State University alumni